Palase may refer to:

Palasë, a village in southern Albanian
Palase, Estonia, a village in Rapla County, Estonia
Palase as also known as Shithead is a shedding-type card game using a standard playing deck